Alex Uttley (born 12 May 1985) is a British acrobatic gymnast who won the title of world men's fours champion with Adam Buckingham, Adam McAssey and Jonathan Stranks in July 2010 in Poland.

Uttley is a member of Spelbound, the gymnastic group who rose to fame in 2010, winning the fourth series of Britain's Got Talent. The prize was £100,000 and the opportunity to appear at the 2010 Royal Variety Performance.

Beginning on 9 August 2014, Uttley took part in the BBC One gymnastics series Tumble partnered with Loose Women anchor Andrea McLean.

References

External links
 

1985 births
Living people
British acrobatic gymnasts
Male acrobatic gymnasts
Britain's Got Talent contestants
People from Halifax, West Yorkshire
Medalists at the Acrobatic Gymnastics World Championships
Competitors at the 2009 World Games
World Games silver medalists
21st-century British people